In physics, the attenuation length or absorption length is the distance  into a material when the probability has dropped to  that a particle has not been absorbed.

Mathematically, the probability of finding a particle at depth x into the material is calculated by Beer–Lambert law:

.

In general  is material and energy dependent.

See also
 Beer's Law
 Mean free path
 Attenuation coefficient
 Attenuation (electromagnetic radiation)
 Radiation length

References
 
 https://web.archive.org/web/20050215215652/http://www.ct.infn.it/~rivel/Glossario/node2.html

External links
 http://henke.lbl.gov/optical_constants/atten2.html

Particle physics
Experimental particle physics